Pectinifrons was a rangeomorph, a member of the Ediacara biota found at Mistaken Point, Newfoundland.

It was a multi-branched organism with a comb-like appearance. It grew by adding fronds, then inflating them.

See also
 List of Ediacaran genera

References

Incertae sedis
Rangeomorpha
Ediacaran North America